Raphael Semmes (September 27, 1809 – August 30, 1877) was an officer in the Confederate Navy during the American Civil War. Until then, he had been a serving officer in the US Navy from 1826 to 1860.

During the American Civil War, Semmes was captain of the cruiser , the most successful commerce raider in maritime history, taking 65 prizes. Late in the war, he was promoted to rear admiral and also acted briefly as a brigadier general in the Confederate States Army. His appointment or arrangement to act as a temporary brigadier general from April 5 to April 26, 1865, was never submitted to or officially confirmed by the Confederate Senate.

Early life and education
Semmes was born in Charles County, Maryland, on Tayloe's Neck, a cousin of future Confederate general Paul Jones Semmes and of future Union Navy Captain Alexander Alderman Semmes.

He graduated from Charlotte Hall Military Academy
and entered the U.S. Navy as a midshipman in 1826. Semmes first served on the Lexington, cruising the Caribbean and the Mediterranean until September 1826, when he was placed on leave for reasons of ill health.  After a short convalescence he served on the U.S.S. Erie for part of 1829 and on the U.S.S. Brandywine (formerly Susquehanna) for the rest of 1829 and the first nine months of the following year. On September 29, 1830, he was posted to the U.S.S. Porpoise of the West Indies squadron, which was attempting to suppress piracy in the Caribbean. Semmes then studied law and was admitted to the bar. He was promoted to lieutenant in February 1837.

Career
In December 1846 a squall hit the ship while under full sail in pursuit of a vessel off Veracruz. Somers capsized and was lost along with 37 sailors.

Following the war, Semmes went on extended leave at Mobile, Alabama, where he practiced law and wrote Service Afloat and Ashore During the Mexican War. He became extremely popular, and the nearby town of Semmes, Alabama was named after him. Semmes also maintained a home in Josephine, Alabama on Perdido Bay. He was promoted to the rank of commander in 1855 and was assigned to lighthouse duties until 1860. Following Alabama's secession from the Union, Semmes was offered a Confederate naval appointment by the provisional government; he resigned from the U.S. Navy the next day, February 15, 1861.

Confederate service

After appointment to the Confederate Navy as a commander and a futile assignment to purchase arms in the North, Semmes was sent to New Orleans to convert the steamer Habana into the cruiser/commerce raider .

Semmes's command of CSS Sumter lasted only six months, but during that time he ranged wide, raiding U.S. commercial shipping in both the Caribbean Sea and Atlantic Ocean; his actions accounted for the loss of 18 merchant vessels, while always eluding pursuit by Union warships. By January 1862, Sumter required a major overhaul. Semmes's crew surveyed the vessel while in neutral Gibraltar and determined that the repairs to her boilers were too extensive to be completed there. Semmes paid off the crew and laid up the vessel. U.S. Navy vessels maintained a vigil outside the harbor until she was disarmed and sold at auction in December 1862, eventually being renamed and converted to a blockade runner.

Semmes and several of his officers traveled to England where he was promoted to captain. He then was ordered to the Azores to take up command and oversee the coaling and outfitting with cannon of the newly built British steamer Enrica as a sloop-of-war, which thereafter became the Confederate commerce raider . Semmes sailed on Alabama from August 1862 to June 1864. His operations carried him from the Atlantic to the Gulf of Mexico, around Africa's Cape of Good Hope, and into the Pacific to the East Indies.

Alabama finally sailed back to the Atlantic and made port in Cherbourg, France, for a much-needed overhaul; she was soon blockaded by the pursuing Union steam sloop-of-war, . Captain Semmes took Alabama out on June 19, 1864, and met the similar Kearsarge in one of the most famous naval engagements of the Civil War.

The commander of Kearsarge had, while in port at the Azores the year before, turned his warship into a makeshift partial ironclad;  of the ship's port and starboard midsection were stepped-up-and-down to the waterline with overlapping rows of heavy chain armor, hidden behind black-painted wooden deal board covers. Alabamas much-too-rapid gunnery and misplaced aim, combined with the deteriorated state of her gunpowder and shell fuses, enabled a victory for both of Kearsarges  Dahlgren smoothbore cannon. While Alabama opened fire at long range, Kearsarge steamed straight at her, exposing the Union sloop-of-war to potentially devastating raking fire. In their haste, however, Alabama's gunners fired many shells too high.

At , Kearsarge turned broadside to engage and opened fire. Soon the heavy  Dahlgren cannon began to find their mark. After receiving a fatal shell to the starboard waterline, which tore open a portion of Alabamas hull, causing her steam engine to explode from the shell's impact, Semmes was forced to order the striking of his ship's Stainless Banner battle ensign and later to display a hand-held white flag of surrender to finally halt the engagement.

As the commerce raider was going down by the stern, Kearsarge stood off at a distance and observed at the orders of her captain (John Ancrum Winslow); Winslow eventually sent rescue boats for survivors after taking aboard Alabama survivors from one of the raider's two surviving longboats. As his command sank, the wounded Semmes threw his sword into the sea, depriving Kearsarges Captain Winslow of the traditional surrender ceremony of having it handed over to him as victor. Semmes was eventually rescued, along with forty-one of his crewmen, by the British yacht Deerhound and three French pilot boats. He and his forty-one men were taken to England where all but one recovered; while there they were hailed as naval heroes, despite the loss of Alabama

From England, Semmes made his way back to America via Cuba and from there a safe shore landing on the Texas gulf coast. It took his small party many weeks of journeying through the war-devastated South before he was finally able to make his way to the Confederate capital. He was promoted to rear admiral in February 1865, and during the last months of the war he commanded the James River Squadron from his flagship, the heavily armored ironclad .

With the fall of Richmond, in April 1865, Semmes supervised the destruction of all the squadron's nearby warships and thereafter acted as a brigadier general in the Confederate States Army, the implication being that he was appointed to that grade. Historians John and David Eicher show Semmes as appointed to the grade of temporary brigadier general (unconfirmed) on April 5, 1865.

Semmes's appointment as a brigadier general was at most an informal arrangement made four days before General Robert E. Lee's surrender of the Army of Northern Virginia at the Battle of Appomattox Courthouse on April 9, 1865. That appointment was not and could not have been submitted to or confirmed by the Confederate Senate, since the Second Confederate Congress adjourned for the last time on March 18, 1865. Historian Bruce Allardice notes that Semmes was vague about this appointment in his memoirs and considered his naval rank of rear admiral to be the equivalent of a brigadier general.

After the destruction of the naval squadron, Semmes's sailors were turned into an infantry unit and dubbed the "Naval Brigade"; Semmes was then placed in command. His intention for the brigade was to join Lee's army after burning their vessels. Lee's army, however, was already cut off from Richmond, so most of Semmes's men boarded a train and escaped to join General Joseph E. Johnston's army in North Carolina. A few men of the Naval Brigade were able to join with Lee's rear guard and fought at the Battle of Sailor's Creek.

Semmes and the Naval Brigade were surrendered to Union Major General William T. Sherman with Johnston's army at Bennett Place near Durham Station, North Carolina; he was subsequently paroled on May 1, 1865. Semmes's parole notes that he held commissions as both a brigadier general and rear admiral in the Confederate service when he surrendered with General Johnston's army. He insisted on his parole being written to include the brigadier general commission in anticipation of being charged with piracy by the United States government.

After the war

The U.S. briefly held Semmes as a prisoner after the war, but released him on parole, then later arrested him for treason on December 15, 1865. After a good deal of behind-the-scenes political machinations, all charges were eventually dropped, and he was finally released on April 7, 1866. After his release, Semmes worked as a professor of philosophy and literature at Louisiana State Seminary (now Louisiana State University), as a county judge, and then as a newspaper editor. Semmes later returned to Mobile and resumed his legal career.

In October 1866 the Louisiana State Seminary offered Semmes a position as Professor of Moral Philosophy and English Literature. The position paid $3,000 per year. Semmes assumed this role on January 1, 1867. His fellow faculty-members described him as "dignified and easy to talk with". His teaching method in classes incorporated mainly formal lectures, with very little discussion. In May 1867 Semmes resigned from academia to take over as editor of a newspaper, the Memphis Bulletin.

He defended both his actions at sea and the political actions of the southern states in his 1869 Memoirs of Service Afloat During The War Between the States. Semmes is credited with helping to popularize the phrase “War Between the States" to refer to the American Civil War.

In 1871 the citizens of Mobile presented Semmes with what became known as the Raphael Semmes House, and it remained his residence until his untimely death in 1877 from complications that followed food poisoning from eating contaminated shrimp. Semmes was then interred in Mobile's Old Catholic Cemetery.

Claimed links between Raphael Semmes and Captain Nemo

In 1998 the Jules Verne scholar William Butcher was the first to identify a possible link between the Birkenhead, England built CSS Alabama and Captain Nemo’s Nautilus from the Jules Verne 1869 novel Twenty Thousand Leagues Under the Seas. Butcher stated that The Alabama, which claimed to have sunk 75 merchantmen, was destroyed by the Unionist Kearsarge off Cherbourg on 11th June 1864…. This battle has clear connections with Nemo’s final attack, also in the English Channel.

Jules Verne had himself made a previous comparison between the Birkenhead built CSS Alabama and the Nautilus in a letter to his publisher Pierre-Jules Hetzel in March 1869.

In September 2021 the Birkenhead born geography teacher John Lamb noted that both the hull of the fictional Nautilus and the hull of the real-life Confederate warship CSS Alabama had been built in secret at the Laird's shipyard in Birkenhead, lying opposite the port of Liverpool. Furthermore, both vessels had been completed on a ‘desert island’ - in the case of the Alabama on the Azores Island of Terceira

In Jules Verne's Twenty Thousand Leagues Under the Seas (1869) Captain Nemo explains how he built the Nautilus… "Each of its components, Dr Aronnax, was sent to me from a different point on the globe via a forwarding address. ....  the iron plates for its hull by Laird’s of Liverpool.... I set up my workshops on a small desert island in the middle of the ocean. There with my workmen, that is my good companions whom I instructed and trained, I completed our Nautilus."

According to the historian Stephen Fox, Captain Raphael Semmes had portraits of General Robert E Lee and the Confederate President Jefferson Davis on the cabin wall of the CSS Alabama. In Jules Verne’s Twenty Thousand Leagues Under the Seas, Captain Nemo has portraits of Abraham Lincoln and the radical abolitionist John Brown adorning the cabin walls of the Nautilus. Raphael Semmes was a supporter of slavery. while Captain Nemo is a militant anti-slaver who adopts the same 'ambush' tactics at sea as John Brown had used on land.

The two-year voyage of the CSS Alabama had covered a distance of approximately 75,000 miles which equates to just over 21,700 leagues and Jules Verne may have chosen Captain Nemo’s motto of ‘Mobilis in Mobile’ quite simply because the captain of the CSS Alabama – Raphael Semmes, was a resident of Mobile, Alabama.

In 1869 Captain Raphael Semmes released his American Civil War memoirs entitled Memoirs of Service Afloat During the War Between the States. In the same year of 1869, Jules Verne released his classic novel Twenty Thousand leagues Under the Seas John Lamb catalogued the many similarities between the two books on his website Jules Verne and the Heroes of Birkenhead in August 2022.

John Lamb hypothesized that to Jules Verne the CSS Alabama and Captain Nemo's Nautilus might essentially be one and the same and that the militant abolitionist Captain Nemo is the ‘alter ego’ of the pro slavery Raphael Semmes - i.e. the ‘opposite of oneself’

In their respective books, Memoirs Afloat During the War Between the States (1869) and Twenty Thousand Leagues Under the Seas (1869), both Raphael Semmes and Jules Verne mention world shipping being alarmed by a destructive maritime force which is compared to a ‘sea monster’, in both books the monster is jeered at in the press and celebrated in song.

Raphael Semmes was denounced by Abraham Lincoln as a ‘pirate’ and a bounty put on his head by the U.S Navy Department of Admiral David Farragut. The fictional Captain Nemo is also denounced as a pirate in Twenty Thousand Leagues Under the Sea and chased by a warship called the USS Abraham Lincoln, whose commander, a Captain Farragut offers a reward for the first sighting of the ‘sea monster’.

Both Raphael Semmes and Jules Verne talk about their respective vessels as being illuminated by an eerie light and slowly moving in circles around their ‘prey’. The CSS Alabama and the Nautilus both have a specialized recess in their hull, and a state-of-the-art water condenser on board to provide fresh water for their multinational crews.

Both the CSS Alabama and the Nautilus encounter an imaginary island, sail through a patch of white water, have an aversion for the coast of Brazil, but still pause to describe the fresh waters of the Amazon as they pour in to the sea.

Raphael Semmes seeks sanctuary for the CSS Alabama on the Brazilian volcanic island of Fernando de Noronha, where he takes on coal from his supply ship Agrippina whereas Captain Nemo seeks sanctuary for the Nautilus within the flooded crater of a secret volcanic island where his crew proceed to mine their own coal.

On the respective voyages of both the CSS Alabama and the Nautilus an elaborate funeral is described in detail and both captains are visibly overcome with emotion. while both authors talk about a grave / mausoleum sealed up by coral over time.

Both Raphael Semmes and Captain Nemo describe the nature and the effects of the Gulf Stream in detail, both have a ‘museum of curiosities’ gathered on dingy trips, and while Raphael Semmes collects an Amazonian seed pod that looks like a Havanna cigar, Captain Nemo gives Doctor Aronnax a seaweed cigar which Doctor Aronnax mistakes for a Havanna cigar.

Both Raphael Semmes and Captain Nemo talk about sleeping sperm whales and highlight the dangers to right whales in venturing into the warm waters near the equator. Both Raphael Semmes and Captain Nemo kill a single albatross, sail through swarms of argonauts / nautilus, and refer to food that a Malay would cook.

Raphael Semmes claims a fully grown swordfish can pierce a ship’s wooden hull while Doctor Aronnax claims a giant Narwhal’s tusk can pierce a ship’s hull.

Both Raphael Semmes and Jules Verne describe the journey across the Indian Ocean as tedious to everyone but the natural historian, and then come across ships from the P and O Line. Both Raphael Semmes and Captain Nemo pride themselves on their good manners and hospitality, but both lament the passing of sail to be replaced by steam.

Whereas Raphael Semmes comments at length on the sinking of the Liverpool built Confederate commerce raider CSS Florida it is Captain Nemo and the Nautilus who come across the remains of a ship called the Florida (a Confederate link first identified by the Jules Verne scholar William Butcher in 1998).

Both Raphael Semmes and Captain Nemo pay tribute to the oceanographer Matthew Fontaine Maury and comment on his fall from grace after the American Civil War. Whereas Captain Semmes compares the CSS Alabama to his wife Captain Nemo compares the Nautilus to himself.
Raphael Semmes laments the loss of the British built CSS Alabama and its largely British crew as if it were the loss of his wife and children, whereas Captain Nemo laments the actual loss of his wife and children – killed by the British. Whereas Raphael Semmes states that India should never be free from British rule, Captain Nemo is later revealed to be an Indian who fought to be free from British rule.

In the 1874 sequel novel to Twenty Thousand Leagues Under the Sea entitled The Mysterious Island Captain Nemo returns and is revealed as the rebel Indian Prince Dakkar a possible derivation of the Afrikaan CSS Alabama celebratory song Daar Kom die Alibama ('Here Comes the Alabama') whereby moving the letter 'k' two spaces to the left gives the phrase Dakar om die Alibama.

Raphael Semmes visits Paris after the sinking of the CSS Alabama.

On 19 June 1864 the CSS Alabama was sunk by the USS Kearsarge off the coast of Cherbourg, France. Raphael Semmes was rescued from the waters of the English Channel by the yacht Deerhound of the Royal Mersey Yacht Club of Tranmere, Birkenhead.

Semmes’s journals were saved from the waters of the English Channel by the CSS Alabama crewman Michael Mars and returned to him aboard the Deerhound. Semmes was then taken by John Lancaster, the owner of the Deerhound to the Port of Southampton, where according to Semmes's memoirs he was met by the Reverend Francis Tremlett. Tremlett was also a member of the Royal Mersey Yacht Club of Tranmere Birkenhead.

The following evening Raphael Semmes dined with John Laird, the Member of Parliament for Birkenhead, the builder of the CSS Alabama and by literary association, the builder of Captain Nemo’s Nautilus. John Laird M.P. was also a member of the Royal Mersey Yacht Club of Tranmere, Birkenhead.

According to the Semmes biographer Stephen Fox, once Semmes had recovered at Belsize Park parsonage, in London, the Reverend Francis Tremlett then obtained a forged passport for Semmes under the name of ‘Raymond Smith’ and together with Tremlett’s sister, Louisa and two other friends, they took Semmes on a European tour to Belgium and the Swiss Alps.

Fox writes in his biography of Semmes Wolf of the Deep (2007)

On the fifth of September they took a train from Geneva to Paris, “where we remained for a week and did the city.” On September 15 the rest of the party left for England. Semmes remained in Paris for a few days longer, perhaps preferring the more discrete safety of travelling alone after the conspicuous company of his English friends. While he stayed on, Semmes received a letter from his faithful clerk, Breedlove Smith, in Liverpool asking for instructions. “My movements will be so uncertain for some weeks yet,” Semmes wrote him, “that I think that you had better not wait longer for me, but make the best of your way home by the first opportunity that offers.”

Wolf of the Deep. Stephen Fox (2007)

John Lamb hypothesized that it must have been at this time that Raphael Semmes handed over his journals to the French author Jules Verne as those same journals were to become the literary template of Verne's 1869 masterpiece Twenty Thousand Leagues Under the Seas.

In November 2021, Alan Evans the Director of Regeneration and Place at Wirral Borough Council, endorsed the further claim of John Lamb that Jules Verne had set his sequel novel The Mysterious Island in Birkenhead and the Wirral Peninsula, so confirming that the Nautilus and Captain Nemo had indeed returned back to their 'home port' of Birkenhead - also the home port of the CSS Alabama.

Other Claimed References to Raphael Semmes in the works of Jules Verne.

The Adventures of Captain Hatteras (1864) 
The Adventures of Captain Hatteras is Jules Verne’s first novel in his 56 volume of works called the Voyages Extraordinaires and it begins in Birkenhead, England with a ship called the Forward, which like the CSS Alabama is built in secret in Birkenhead of unusual design, for an unknown Captain on an unspecified mission. The USS Hatteras was the name of the United States warship sunk by Raphael Semmes on 11 January 1863.

A Journey to the Centre of the Earth (1864) 

The novel follows the route of the 16th century Icelandic explorer Arne Saknussemm to the very core of the planet. Saknussemm has left a note in an ancient Icelandic runic script that must be translated into Latin and then read backwards to be deciphered. This translation locates the volcanic chimney in Iceland that leads to the centre of the earth. The cipher of Arne Saknussemm is claimed to be the most celebrated cipher in world fiction. ...When we look at into the types of cryptograms other writers of romantic tales and detective stories have employed, we must recognise that he stands head and shoulders above them all, not excluding even Poe..…Verne’s genius calls for admiration and respect – even on the part of professional cryptographers... Jules Verne as Cryptographer. Lt Colonel William. F Friedman. The Signal Corps Bulletin (1940).

In January 2019 Ken Lamb claimed that the name ‘Arne Saknussemm’ itself was a cipher relating directly to Raphael Semmes.

ARNE  SAKNUSSEMM.
Move the first ‘E’ and ‘S’ to the end, and this gives...           ARNA KNUS SEMMES

Then read the last two words backwards and this gives...                                          SEMMES SUNK ARNA

‘Arna’ is Icelandic for ‘the powerful eagle’                                                            SEMMES SUNK THE POWERFUL EAGLE

The American Bald Eagle is the symbol of the United States Navy.

Around the Moon (1869) 

In Jules Verne’s 1869 novel Around the Moon the three astronauts and their ‘lunar module’ splash down in the Pacific Ocean and are rescued by two boats from the Susquehanna. 
Jules Verne writes of the captain of the Susquehanna.

The captain of the Susquehanna, as brave a man as need be, and the humble servant of his officers, returned to his cabin, took a brandy-grog, which earned for the steward no end of praise, and turned in, not without having complimented his servant upon his making beds, and slept a peaceful sleep.

Jules Verne - Around the Moon (1869) Chapter XX The Soundings of the Susquehanna. Wordsworth Classics p392

Raphael Semmes sailed on the Brandywine (formerly Susquehanna) as a young midshipman in the 1820’s. John Lamb hypothesized that Jules Verne uses the coded term ‘brandy grog’ to refer to Semmes’s ship Brandywine (formerly Susquehanna) as Raphael Semmes had used the word ‘grog’ dozens of times in his Memoirs of a Service Afloat. Jules Verne’s description of the captain of the Susquehanna also matched the description of Raphael Semmes in his own Memoirs of Service Afloat During the War Between the States (1869).

The reader has been introduced to my Malayan steward, John, on several occasions. John’s black, lustrous eyes filled with ill-concealed tears, more than once, during the last days of the Sumter, as he smoothed the pillow of my cot with a hand as tender as that of a woman …I consigned my weary head to my pillow, and permitted myself to be sung to sleep by the lullaby chanted by the storm.

Raphael Semmes – Memoirs of Service Afloat during the War Between the States (1869) page 264 and page 343.

A Floating City (1871) 

A Floating City is a semi-autobiographical account of Jules Verne’s journey aboard the ship Great Eastern as Verne sailed from Tranmere Sloyne, Birkenhead, England to New York in March 1867.

As well as being the birthplace of the CSS Alabama, Birkenhead, England is also the scene of the final surrender of the American Civil War, when the CSS Shenandoah, a successor to the CSS Alabama lowered the Confederate flag at Tranmere Sloyne for the last time on November 6th, 1865.

Jules Verne writes’.

A quarter past one sounded from the Birkenhead clock-towers, the moment of departure could not be deferred, if it was intended to make use of the tide. The greater part of the passengers on the poop were gazing at the double landscape of Liverpool and Birkenhead, studded with manufactory chimneys...

...Captain Semmes, Minister of War, has made the South compensate for its ravages in Alabama.

Around the World in Eighty Days (1873) 

This question of the Journey Round the World was commented on, discussed and analysed with as much passion and ardour as a new Alabama Claim. Some took sides with Phileas Fogg...

‘It’s obviously a political meeting,’ said Fix, ‘and the subject must be a very important one. I wouldn’t be surprised if they weren’t still discussing the Alabama Claim, although it’s been settled.’ ‘Possibly,’ was all that Mr Fogg said.

Around the World in Eighty Days by Jules Verne (1873) Oxford World Classics page 25 and page 137.

In 1870 the American entrepreneur George Francis Train became the first person to travel around the world in eighty days. In 1860, Train had previously been celebrated for setting up Europe’s first tram system in Birkenhead. The Alabama Claims refer to the $15million compensation paid by the British government to the United States as compensation for the damage inflicted by Confederate warships (the foremost being the CSS Alabama) built in Britain during the American Civil War.

North Against South (1887)

The naval events which caused so much stir were the appearance of the Sumter and her famous Captain Semmes;

North Against South by Jules Verne (1887)

North Against South (Texar's Revenge) is an adventure story set during the American Civil War. The Jules Verne Encyclopedia has criticized it as a padded to almost unwieldy proportions by a quantity of remarkably inaccurate information about the rebellion.

American Secretary of State William Seward accuses the Birkenhead yacht Deerhound of disappearing with the CSS Alabama's 'valuables'.

On July 8, 1864, Abraham Lincoln’s Secretary of State, William Seward wrote a strongly worded letter to the American ambassador in London Charles Francis Adams complaining about the activities of the yacht Deerhound of the Royal Mersey yacht Club of Tranmere, Birkenhead. Seward was adamant that missing ‘valuables’ from the CSS Alabama were last accounted for being loaded on to the Deerhound a vessel that would ultimately be bound for Birkenhead, England. Seward wrote.

…the presence and the proceedings of a British yacht, the Deerhound, at the battle, require explanation. On reading the statements which have reached this government, it seems impossible to doubt that the Deerhound went out to the place of conflict by concert and arrangement with the commander of the Alabama, and with at least a conditional purpose of rendering her aid and assistance. She did effectually render such aid by rescuing the commander of the Alabama and a portion of his crew from the pursuit of the Kearsarge, and by furtively and clandestinely conveying them to Southampton, within British jurisdiction....
Moreover, we are informed from Paris, that the Deerhound, before going out, received from Semmes, and that she subsequently conveyed away to England, a deposit of money, and other valuables, of which Semmes, in his long piratical career, had despoiled numerous American merchantmen.”…The President will expect you to carefully gather information, to weigh it well, and then to make a proper representation to her Majesty’s government upon the whole subject I have thus presented.

(Office of the Historian, Department of State, United States of America).

Arthur Sinclair, an officer on board the CSS Alabama, in his 1896 memoirs Two Years on the Alabama gave more information on William Seward's 'valuables' prior to docking at Cherbourg.….. 

our strong box was liberally filled with sovereigns at this visit, the proceedings of the wool sale in England, part cargo of the Tuscaloosa, transferred at Angra Pequefia some months since. The Alabama is now as wealthy as a bold buccaneer.

Arthur Sinclair Two Years on the Alabama (1896)

Claimed Links between Captain Raphael Semmes and Robert Louis Stevenson’s novel Treasure Island. 

After taking command of the James River Fleet at Richmond, Virginia, Raphael Semmes was visited by Thomas Connolly, the forty-two-year-old Irish Member of Parliament for Donegal. Connolly reported that he found Captain Semmes “looking as hard & determined as flint”

John Lamb hypothesized that Robert Louis Stevenson would give one of Raphael Semmes’s characters in Treasure Island, the same name that Thomas Connolly had given Semmes …that of Captain Flint. The plot of Treasure Island revolves around looking for the late Captain Flint’s buried treasure.

John Lamb further hypothesized that Raphael Semmes, the burner of 52 ships would also ‘play’ the living pirate in Treasure Island known appropriately as ‘Barbeque’ or the ‘Sea Cook’, this pirate is more commonly known in world literature as Long John Silver. Lamb further claimed that William Seward would return at the start of the novel in the role of the pirate ‘Billy Bones’ the owner of the treasure map showing the location of Captain Flint’s treasure and cited several clues that he claimed were purposely given by Robert Louis Stevenson.

In his memoirs, Raphael Semmes would refer to William H Seward as ‘Billy’.

they had taken Billy’s measure to a fraction ….. and call our cruisers, “corsairs,” or “pirates.”

Raphael Semmes. Memoirs of Service Afloat During the War Between the States (1869).

William Seward’s biographer Walter Stahr would describe Seward as.

a familiar figure around Washington, invariably disheveled, in an old jacket and trousers that hung limply on his narrow frame’

Walter Stahr. Seward: Lincoln's indispensable Man (2013)

In 2012 the journalist Dorothy Wickenden wrote in the New Yorker about William Seward stating

Abraham Lincoln was warned about Seward’s drinking and smoking, a charge that Lincoln simply waved aside.

Dorothy Wickenden.  Union Man - a new biography of an unlikely American statesman.

As a comparison, Robert Louis Stevenson would describe the character of Billy Bones in Treasure Island as.

that filthy, heavy, bleared scarecrow of a pirate of ours, sitting, far gone in rum...

Chapter 1: The Old Sea-dog at the Admiral Benbow.

He has a cut on one cheek and a mighty pleasant way with him, particularly in drink, has my mate Bill. We'll put it, for argument like, that your captain has a cut on one cheek—and we'll put it, if you like, that that cheek's the right one. Ah, well! I told you. Now, is my mate Bill in this here house?

Chapter 2. Black Dog Appears and Disappears

I got the rum, to be sure, and tried to put it down his throat, but his teeth were tightly shut and his jaws as strong as iron.

Chapter 2. Black Dog Appears and Disappears. Robert Louis Stevenson. Treasure Island (1881)

John Lamb decided to investigate as to whether William H Seward did indeed have a scar on his right cheek
What he found was that on April 14, 1865, the same night that Abraham Lincoln was assassinated, William Seward was attacked in his home by Lewis Powell a co-conspirator with John Wilkes Booth in the Lincoln Assassination Plot. The attempt on Seward’s life failed but Powell managed to severely slash Seward’s cheek with a Bowie knife. Seward was left permanently disfigured with a ‘cut on one cheek’ and ‘that cheek's the right one.

William Seward had sustained head injuries in a carriage accident just a few weeks before the Powell assassination attempt, he was already wearing an iron brace on his jaw, which deflected most of Powell's blows and probably saved his life, Seward did indeed, just like the character of Billy Bones have jaws as strong as iron..

Lamb theorized that not only had Jules Verne and Robert Louis Stevenson used many of the same real-life Birkenhead and Wirral 'stage set' locations in their respective novels Mysterious Island and Treasure Island, but all the characters in each novel were based on real historical figures or combinations of figures, some of whom may have known about their portrayals. Raphael Semmes would play many parts in Treasure Island including Captain Flint the Pirate, Captain Flint the Parrot, the disciplinarian Captain Smollett, the pirate Black Dog as well as Long John Silver himself. Lamb also hypothesized that Jules Verne and Stevenson were influenced by the words of Jacques in William Shakespeare's comedy As You Like It.

All the world’s a stage,

And all the men and women merely players;

They have their exits and their entrances;

And one man in his time plays many parts.

The last words of Raphael Semmes in his 833-page Memoirs of Service Afloat During the War Between the States are.

There are still other acts of the drama to be performed.

In August 2022 the British Member of Parliament for Birkenhead, Mick Whitley, supported John Lamb's claim that Robert Louis Stevenson had set his entire classic pirate adventure novel Treasure Island (1881) in over 30 locations in the towns of Birkenhead and Wallasey on the Wirral Peninsula. His letter of support for the claims linking both Jules Verne's novel Mysterious Island and Robert Louis Stevenson's Treasure Island to Birkenhead were posted on the Jules Verne and the Heroes of Birkenhead website in August 2022.

On his Jules Verne and the Heroes of Birkenhead website John Lamb concluded that Raphael Semmes may have actively cooperated with the author Jules Verne as a sign of his own Christian repentance for having both supported slavery and inadvertently prolonging the American Civil War. This repentance was 'hidden in plain sight' in the novels Twenty Thousand Leagues Under the Seas, The Mysterious Island and Treasure Island and perhaps sanctioned at the very highest level.

According to William H Seward, Abraham Lincoln's Secretary of State, the Alabama's piratical 'valuables' (reported by Arthur Sinclair as a strong box of gold sovereigns) was last said to be on board the yacht Deerhound, a yacht eventually bound for its home port of Birkenhead, England.

Semmes's giving up and hiding his 'Confederate gold' in Birkenhead would be an insignificant part of his possible repentance, but a highly symbolic affirmation of that possible repentance in its own right. Lamb finally concluded that reading the entirety of Robert Louis Stevenson's novel rather than perusing his treasure map, would indeed point to the modern-day location of the treasure.

Legacy

Semmes is a member of the Alabama Hall of Fame. One of the streets on the current Louisiana State University campus once carried his full name in his honor, as does Semmes Avenue in Richmond, Virginia. A life-sized statue of Admiral Semmes was removed by the city of Mobile early on the morning of June 5, 2020. A suburban area of western Mobile County is named for him, as well as a hotel in downtown Mobile named The Admiral Hotel.

When Semmes returned to the South from England, he brought a ceremonial Stainless Banner (the second national flag of the Confederacy) with him. It was inherited by his grandchildren, Raphael Semmes III and Mrs. Eunice Semmes Thorington. After his sister's death, Raphael Semmes III donated the ensign to the state of Alabama on September 19, 1929. Today, the battle ensign resides in the collection of the Alabama Department of Archives and History among its Confederate Naval collection, listed as "Admiral Semmes' Flag, Catalogue No. 86.1893.1 (PN10149-10150)". Their provenance reconstruction shows that it was presented to Semmes in England sometime after the sinking of the Alabama by "Lady Dehogton and other English ladies".

Dates of rank
 Midshipman, USN – April 1, 1826
 Passed midshipman, USN – April 26, 1832
 Lieutenant, USN – February 9, 1837
 Commander, USN – September 14, 1855
 Resigned from USN – February 15, 1861
 Commander, CSN – March 26, 1861
 Captain, CSN – July 15, 1862
 Rear admiral, CSN – February 10, 1865

References

Citations

Sources 

 Allardice, Bruce S. More Generals in Gray. Baton Rouge: Louisiana State University Press, 1995. .
 Delaney, Norman C. 'Old Beeswax': Raphael Semmes of the Alabama. Harrisburg, PA, Vol. 12, #8, December 1973 issue, Civil War Times Illustrated. No ISSN.
 Eicher, John H., and David J. Eicher, Civil War High Commands. Stanford: Stanford University Press, 2001. .
 Fox, Stephen. Wolf of the Deep: Raphael Semmes and the Notorious Confederate Raider CSS Alabama . Vintage Books, 2007. .
 Gindlesperger, James. Fire on the Water: The USS Kearsarge and the CSS Alabama . Burd Street Press, 2005. .
 Luraghi, Raimondo. A History of the Confederate Navy. Naval Institute Press, 1996. .
 Madaus, H. Michael. Rebel Flags Afloat: A Survey of the Surviving Flags of the Confederate States Navy, Revenue Service, and Merchant Marine. Winchester, MA, Flag Research Center, 1986. . (An 80-page special edition of The Flag Bulletin magazine, #115, devoted entirely to Confederate naval flags.)
 Semmes, R., CSS, Commander. The Cruise of the Alabama and the Sumter (two volumes in one), Carlton, Publisher, New York, 1864. 
 
 Secretary of the Navy. Sinking of the Alabama: Destruction of the Alabama by the Kearsarge . Washington, D.C., Navy Yard, 1864. (Annual report in the library of the Naval Historical Center.)
 Silverstone, Paul H. Civil War Navies, 1855–1883. Naval Institute Press, 2001. .

Further reading 
 Semmes, Raphael. The Cruise of the Alabama and the Sumter, 2001. .
 Taylor, John M. Confederate Raider, Raphel Semmes of the Alabama, 1994. .

External links

 
 
 
 Raphael Semmes article, Encyclopedia of Alabama
 

1809 births
1877 deaths
American pirates
Burials at the Catholic Cemetery (Mobile, Alabama)
Catholics from Alabama
Charlotte Hall Military Academy alumni
Confederate States Army generals
Confederate States Navy admirals
CSS Alabama
Military personnel from Mobile, Alabama
People of Alabama in the American Civil War
People of Maryland in the American Civil War
United States Navy officers
United States Navy personnel of the Mexican–American War
People from Charles County, Maryland
Military personnel from Maryland
Catholics from Maryland
Southern Historical Society